The 2019 Pan American U20 Athletics Championships is the 20th edition of the biennial track and field competition for under-20 athletes from the Americas, organised by the Association of Panamerican Athletics. It is held in San José, Costa Rica, from 19 to 21 July 2019.

Medal summary

Men

Women

Medal table

References

Pan American U20 Athletics Championships
Panamerican U20 Junior Championships
Panamerican U20 Junior Championships
International athletics competitions hosted by Costa Rica
Panamerican U20 Junior Championships
Panamerican U20 Junior Championships